Mayor Nair is a 1966 Indian Malayalam-language film, directed by S. R. Puttanna and produced by P. A. Thangal. The film stars Adoor Bhasi, Thikkurissy Sukumaran Nair, Balu and Ramesh. It is an adaptation of Thomas Hardy's 1886 novel The Mayor of Casterbridge. The film was released on 24 December 1966.

Plot

Cast 

Adoor Bhasi
Thikkurissy Sukumaran Nair
Balu
Ramesh
Kalpana
Kamaladevi
Kerala Gopi
Kottarakkara Sreedharan Nair
Meena
P. A. Thangal
Santha Devi

Soundtrack 
The music was composed by L. P. R. Varma and the lyrics were written by Vayalar Ramavarma.

References

External links 
 

1960s Malayalam-language films
1966 films
Films based on The Mayor of Casterbridge